The mountain scops owl (Otus spilocephalus), sometimes referred to as the spotted scops owl, is a species of owl in the family Strigidae. It is locally common in its main habitat which covers some parts of Asia, including Bangladesh Bhutan, India, Malaysia, Nepal, Taiwan, and Thailand. It has a short high-pitched call. Their call sounds like a two-note whistle, "plew-plew" or "he-he", although the female's songs are rarely heard. Their calls can also vary between different populations allowing one to determine a bird's origin.

References

BirdLife Species Factsheet
http://www.owlpages.com/owls.php?genus=Otus&species=spilocephalus
https://sora.unm.edu/sites/default/files/journals/om/om025.pdf
www.jstor.org/stable/3676817

External links

mountain scops owl
Birds of South China
Birds of the Himalayas
Birds of Eastern Himalaya
Birds of Southeast Asia
mountain scops owl
mountain scops owl